The Kot massacre took place on 14 September 1846 when then Kaji Jang Bahadur Kunwar and his brothers killed about 30-40 civil, military officers and palace guards of the Nepalese palace court including the Prime Minister of Nepal and a relative of the King, Chautariya Fateh Jung Shah and other senior-most ministers and army generals at the palace armory (Kot) of Hanuman Dhoka in Kathmandu. 

The Kot meeting was called upon by Queen Rajya Laxmi Devi  after the same night murder of her confidante Kaji Gagan Singh Thapa  while performing worship at his prayer room. The Kot meeting turned ugly and eventually, the Jang brothers and their supporters led an open court full-fledged assault on all rival participants in the meeting. This massacre led to the loss of power of political clans such as Chautariyas, Pandes, Thapas, and Basnyats and that of King Rajendra Bikram Shah and Queen Rajya Laxmi Devi and ultimately the establishment of the Rana autocracy in Nepal.

Background
At the peak of instability in Nepalese politics, a coalition ministry was formed in September 1845, headed by Fateh Jang Chautaria, but the real power behind the throne was General Gagan Singh Khawas , who controlled seven regiments in the army compared to the three under the prime minister. Abhiman Singh Rana Magar and Jung Bahadur Kunwar also served as commanders, each with three regiments. It is occasionally alleged that general Gagan Singh Khawas also had an illicit relationship with Queen Rajya Laxmi Devi. Since the king was mentally unfit to rule, it was the queen who handled affairs of state on his behalf, and in this capacity, it was necessary for her to converse occasionally with the general.

Gagan Singh Khawas was found dead on the balcony of his palace during the night of 16 September 1846. The queen commanded Bahadur, who happened to be ready with his regiments, to assemble the entire administrative establishment of the country immediately at the courtyard of the palace armoury. Following the queen's orders, Jang Bahadur ordered his men to let people inside the Kot but not to let them out without Queen's or his own orders.

Overview
Following the Queen's order, courtiers hurried to the Kot as soon as they heard a royal summons. Many of the courtiers were unarmed except for a sword, as they had responded immediately to the royal summons. The armies allocated by Jung Bahadur also had taken most of the arms of courtiers who had managed to bring them. Queen Laxmi Devi and King Rajendra Bikram Shah were also present in Kot.

At almost midnight, most of the courtiers were present at Kot. Everyone there was full of fears and skeptical thoughts. General Abhiman Singh Rana Magar spoke to the King about the possibility of a massacre. His presence had relieved some of the members present. Abhiman Singh also fetched three troops under his control to Kot.

Prime Minister Chautariya Fateh Jung Shah had still not arrived. Jung Bahadur Rana called his younger brother Bam Bahadur to fetch Fateh Jung. Emotions ran high among the assembled bands of nobles and their followers, who listened to the Queen give an emotional harangue blaming the Pandes and demanding that Abhiman Singh Rana Magar to execute Kaji Bir Keshar Pande, whom she suspected for the death of Gagan Singh. Abhiman Singh hesitated and looked to the King. The King hesitated and said to punish the guilty only after a proper investigation of the matter. He pointed out that he must have a discussion with Prime Minister regarding this matter and left. He then left Hanuman Dhoka palace and went to the British residency. When he was denied an audience with the Resident at such a late hour, he went to Narayanhiti Palace. In Narayanhiti, King Rajendra had some time alone with the Prime Minister. Either King Rajendra had not wanted to give information about the conditions at Kot or Fateh Jung had not understood the point. In either case, Fateh Jung went to Kot with simple security.

Meanwhile, at Kot, surrounded by Jang Bahadur's regiments, tension grew high as most of the nobles and Prime Minister Fateh Jang Shah gathered there. Seeing a high possibility of bloodshed, Jang Bahadur, Fateh Jang and Abhiman Singh Rana decided that Jang Bahadur and Fateh Jang should try to calm the Queen, and Abhiman Singh Rana Magar, who had disobeyed the Queen's orders, would stay behind. As the two went to find the Queen, Abhiman Singh decided to move his own regiments to Kot, but he was prevented from leaving. Abhiman Singh tried to force his way out, and was killed in the process. After panic ensued, the bloodshed began. Many Thapas, Pandes and Basnyats died, including Fateh Jang, Khadga Bikram Shah and Dalbhanjan Pande. Some escaped by climbing over walls and roofs and even through the drainage systems. Jang Bahadur easily used the situation to eliminate his rivals.

Aftermath
Jang Bahadur was made Prime Minister by the queen immediately after the massacre. Feeling he presented a threat to her power, the Queen conspired to eliminate Jang Bahadur and elevate her son to the throne. The Basnyat Conspiracy—so called because many of its participants belonged to one of the last leading noble families, the Basnyat—was betrayed and its ringleaders were rounded up and executed at Bhandarkhal Parva. A meeting of leading notables, packed with Rana supporters, found the Queen guilty of complicity in the plot, stripped her of her powers, and sent her into exile at Varanasi, along with King Rajendra. The King began plotting his return from India. In 1847, Jang Bahadur informed the troops of the exiled King's activities, announced his dethronement, and elevated Rajendra's son to the throne as Surendra Bikram Shah. King Rajendra Bikram was captured later that year in the Terai and brought back as a prisoner to Bhadgaon, where he spent the rest of his life under house arrest. Jang Bahadur then established the Rana dynasty, which ruled Nepal for more than a century.

See also 

List of massacres in Nepal

Further reading 

Library of Congress - Nepal and Bhutan: Country Studies

References

Notes

Conflicts in 1846
1846 in Nepal
September 1846 events
Massacres in 1846
Massacres in Nepal
Rana regime
Jung Bahadur Rana
History of Kathmandu